Schanche is a surname. Notable people with the surname include:

Liss Schanche, Norwegian politician
Martin Schanche (born 1945), Norwegian politician and racing driver

Norwegian-language surnames